Familial multiple cafe au lait spots, also known as Autosomal dominant multiple cafe au lait spots or Neurofibromatosis type 6, is a rare, cutaneous genetic disorder which is characterized by the hereditary cutaneous presence of several cafe-au-lait spots without any other symptoms of neurofibromatosis. Sporadic cases may be called "Sporadic multiple cafe au lait spots". Few cases have been described in medical literature, although it is estimated that the presence of multiple cafe au lait spots without NF1 is rare (but not extremely rare) among the general population.

History 

It was first discovered when Riccardi et al. described multiple families with cafe-au-lait spots and no association for neurofibromatosis in 1980.

In 1993, Charrow et al. described 5 members from a 4-generation family, these members had the characteristic tell-tale sign of neurofibromatosis, multiple cafe au lait spots, however, testing of the gene usually involved in neurofibromatosis revealed it to be normal. They proposed the name for this condition.

In 1993, Brunner et al. tested the NF1 locus on a small 2-generation family with MCALS affecting 3 of its members (a woman and her two daughters), and they found that the woman and her daughters had a mutation in the same NF1 locus that was different from the one that causes neurofibromatosis type I itself.

In 1994, Arnsmeier et al. described twelve patients from three un-related families, one of the families had axillary and inguinal freckles and Lisch nodes. All three families had no other signs of Neurofibromatosis type I.

References 

Rare genetic syndromes
Syndromes affecting the skin